Das Vort (דאס וואָרט 'The Word') was a Yiddish-language daily newspaper published from Kaunas, Lithuania. Das Vort was an organ of the Labour Zionist Poalei Zion Right.

References

Jews and Judaism in Kaunas
Yiddish socialist newspapers
Zionism in Lithuania
Publications with year of establishment missing
Year of disestablishment missing
Defunct newspapers published in Lithuania
Newspapers published in Kaunas
Jewish Lithuanian history
Yiddish-language mass media in Lithuania
Daily newspapers published in Lithuania